The 2010–11 Slovak 1.Liga season was the 18th season of the Slovak 1. Liga, the second level of ice hockey in Slovakia. 14 teams participated in the league, and SHK 37 Piestany won the championship.

Regular season

Playoffs

Quarterfinals 

 ŠHK 37 Piešťany – HK Dukla Michalovce 3:1 (4:1, 4:1, 1:2, 3:2)
 MHk 32 Liptovský Mikuláš – HK Trnava 3:0 (2:0, 3:1, 4:3)
 HK Spišská Nová Ves – HK Trebišov 3:0 (3:1, 9:3, 4:2)
 HC 46 Bardejov – HC 07 Detva 1:3 (4:0, 1:2sn, 1:4, 2:4)

Semifinals 
 ŠHK 37 Piešťany – HC 07 Detva 3:0 (3:2pp, 5:2, 2:0)
 MHk 32 Liptovský Mikuláš – HK Spišská Nová Ves 3:0 (3:2, 2:1, 4:1)

Final 
 ŠHK 37 Piešťany – MHk 32 Liptovský Mikuláš 4:3 (2:3sn, 4:3, 2:5, 4:0, 2:1, 2:5, 4:0)

External links
 Season on hockeyarchives.info

Slovak 1. Liga
Slovak 1. Liga seasons
4